Acavidae is a taxonomic family of air-breathing land snails, terrestrial pulmonate gastropod molluscs in the superfamily Acavoidea (according to the taxonomy of the Gastropoda by Bouchet & Rocroi, 2005).

Anatomy 
In this family, the number of haploid chromosomes lies between 26 and 35 (according to the values in this table).

Genera 
The family Acavidae has no subfamilies.

Genera in the family Acavidae include:
 Acavus Montfort, 1810
 Ampelita Beck, 1837
 Embertoniphanta Groh & Poppe, 2002
 Eurystyla Ancey, 1887
 Helicophanta Férussac, 1821
 Leucotaenius Martens, 1860
 Oligospira Ancey, 1887
 † Pebasiconcha Wesselingh & Gittenberger, 1999 - with the only species † Pebasiconcha immanis Wesselingh & Gittenberger, 1999
 Stylodonta De Cristofori & Jan, 1832
Genera brought into synonymy
 Acavella Jousseaume, 1894: synonym of Oligospira Ancey, 1887
 Columplica W. Hartmann, 1843: synonym of Stylodonta De Cristofori & Jan, 1832
 Poecilostylus Pilsbry, 1890: synonym of Eurystyla Ancey, 1887
 Stylodon H. Beck, 1837: synonym of Stylodonta De Cristofori & Jan, 1832

References

External links 
 

 
Gastropod families